VTJ Karlovy Vary was a football club in Karlovy Vary, Czech Republic.

In 1995 the club was incorporated into SK Slavia Karlovy Vary. Its last placement was 13th in the 1994–95 Bohemian Football League.

Historical names
 1951 — Krušnohor Karlovy Vary
 1953 — PDA Karlovy Vary 
 1965 — VTJ Dukla Karlovy Vary
 1976 — VTJ Karlovy Vary

Players
Josef Csaplár
Milan Fukal
Martin Frýdek
František Jakubec
Aleš Jindra
Tomáš Kalán
Pavel Lukáš
René Twardzik
Ivo Ulich
Jan Velkoborský
Petr Vlček

References

Association football clubs disestablished in 1995
1995 disestablishments in the Czech Republic
Football clubs in Czechoslovakia
Defunct football clubs in the Czech Republic
Sport in Karlovy Vary
Association football clubs established in 1951
1951 establishments in Czechoslovakia